The Sokoto Grand Vizier, or Wazirin Sokoto, was the Grand Vizier to the Sultan of Sokoto, the Paramount Chief of the Sokoto Caliphate and suzerain of the Usman Danfodiyo Jihad states. The position survived the fall of the empire as a largely honorary ceremonial rank in contemporary Nigeria.

List of Grand Viziers 
 Shaikh Abdullahi bn Fodiyo  (1804–1817)
Gidado dan Laima (1817–1842)
 Abd al-Qadir bn Usman Gidado (1842–1859)
 Ibrahim Khalilu bn Abd al-Qadir (1859–1874) 
Abdullahi Bayero bn Gidado (1874-1886)

 Muhammadu Buhari Bin Ahmad (1886–1910)
 Muhammadu Sambo bn Ahmad  (1910-1912)
 Abd al- Qadir Maccido bn Bukhari (1910–12)
 Adili bn Khalilu (1912–25)
 Abbas bn Bukhari (1925–28)
 Muhammadu Junaidu Bin Buhari (1948–1997) 
 Usman bn Junaidhttps://www.bbc.com/hausa/labarai-41699516 (1997-2018)

 Sambo Wali Junaidu (2018-)

References

Sokoto Caliphate
Grand viziers